Central Iron Ore Enrichment Works (CGOK) specializes in processing and production of raw materials for the steel industry, merchant concentrate with an average Fe content of 65.0% to 68.2% and pellets with an average Fe content of 63.9%. It is the only mine in Ukraine, that simultaneously uses open-pit quartzite fields and underground mining.

Background
Central GOK was established in 1961 in Kryvyi Rih.

Central GOK mines Hleyevatskyi, Petrovskyi and  Artyomovskyi open-pit quartzite fields, and from Ordzhonikidze underground mine. Industrial quartzite resources are 51, 146, 159 and 106 million tons respectively.

Along with three quarries and mine, the works consist of three plants (crushing, concentrate and pellets), and one auxiliary plant, serving the main production.

The company employs nearly 8,500 people.

Northern GOK is included in the Iron Ore Division of Metinvest Holding LLC, which is a component of the System Capital Management group of companies.

As of 2011 annual production stood at 14.2 Mtons of raw ore, more than 5.9 Mtons of iron ore concentrate, and over 2.2 Mtonnes of pellets.

Awards
 Diploma of the Presidium of the Verkhovna Rada of the Ukrainian Soviet Socialist Republic.

References

External links 
 

Metinvest
Mining companies of Ukraine
Mines in Ukraine
Mining companies of the Soviet Union
Kryvyi Rih